Bride Street is a street in the medieval area of Dublin, Ireland.

Location
Bride Street runs from Werburgh Street at the north to New Bride Street at the south. It runs parallel to Patrick Street.

History

Bride Street appears in a 1465 map of Dublin as "Synt Bryd stret". The St Bride's Church for which the street is named is first mentioned in 1178. This church was demolished in the late 1800s to make way for the Iveagh Trust housing scheme. Adelaide Hospital was originally located at 42 Bride Street until 1846.

Many of the older buildings on Bride Street were demolished during the 1960s to widen the road for increased vehicular traffic. Before this, it was one of the streets illustrated by Flora Mitchell for her book Vanishing Dublin. It depicts the store owned by a noted Dublin character, Johnny Foxes.

Molyneux House sits on the corner of Bride Street and Peter Street. Molyneux House is a converted church and modern office extension that was once the offices of the architect Sam Stephenson who also designed the conversion and extension in 1973. It is built on the site of the old Bird Market, and Stephenson provided the traders with a walled side garden from which they continued to trade.

There is a plaque to John Field on the corner of Bride Street and Golden Lane. Some of the series of plaques created by artist Chris Reid are on Bride Street, with quotes from local residents of the area.

References

Streets in Dublin (city)